Lynn Simons is an American politician and educator who served as the 17th Wyoming Superintendent of Public Instruction from 1979 to 1991, as a member of the Democratic Party. She unsuccessfully sought the Democratic senatorial nomination in 1988.

Early life

Lynn Simons graduated with a bachelor's degree in English from the University of Colorado and a master's degree in American studies from the University of Wyoming. In 1957, she joined the American Civil Liberties Union.

Career

Board of Education

In 1971, Simons was appointed by Governor Stanley K. Hathaway to a six-year term on the Wyoming Board of Education to replace Harry F. Hays. She was selected to serve as president of the Wyoming Committee on School Organization in 1975. During her tenure on the Wyoming Board of Education, she served as vice-chair and chair of the board.

Superintendent of Public Instruction

On April 5, 1978, Simons announced that she would seek the Democratic nomination for Wyoming Superintendent of Public Instruction. She won the Democratic nomination against Sydney Spiegel, a history teacher, and defeated incumbent Republican Superintendent Robert Schrader. She was reelected in 1982 and 1986. In 1990, Simons sought reelection, but was defeated by Republican nominee Diana Ohman.

During the 1980 presidential election Simons endorsed President Jimmy Carter for reelection. In 1982, she gave support to a court case in which the Supreme Court of the United States ruled that the children of illegal immigrants could get a free public education. During the 1984 presidential election she endorsed Senator Gary Hart for the Democratic presidential nomination. In 1985, Simons led a twenty member education delegation that visited schools in China and the Soviet Union. In 1985, Lynn was named to the Steering Committee of the Education Commission of the States.

Simons sought the Democratic nomination for the 1988 United States Senate election, but lost in the Democratic primary to John P. Vinch.

Simons is the last Democrat to serve in this position.

Later life

Simons was appointed by President Bill Clinton to serve as a six-state region representative for Secretary of Education Richard Riley in 1993. In 2003, she was appointed by Governor Dave Freudenthal to be Wyoming planning coordinator, but only served for five months before leaving the office. During the 2020 presidential election Simons endorsed Joe Biden for the Democratic presidential nomination.

Electoral history

References

Living people
20th-century American politicians
20th-century American women politicians
University of Colorado alumni
University of Wyoming alumni
Women in Wyoming politics
Wyoming Democrats
Year of birth missing (living people)
21st-century American women
Superintendents of Public Instruction of Wyoming